Jowharah Jones (born 1982) is an American actress and singer. She is best known for her television role as Nico Slater, daughter of Vanessa Williams' character, on the series Ugly Betty, which she played in the first season (that role was played in the fourth season by Yaya DaCosta).

Background
Jones was born in Philadelphia, Pennsylvania, but grew up in Hershey. She attended Milton Hershey School and graduated with honors in 1999. She then moved to New Orleans, where she attended Xavier University of Louisiana as a mathematics major. After a year at Xavier, she moved to New York City to pursue an acting career.

Jones trained at the prestigious Tisch School of the Arts at New York University. During the following four years, she worked two jobs as she attended Tisch full-time and auditioned for stage, television and film roles. After graduating in 2004, she moved to Los Angeles, where she now resides.

Filmography

Film

Television

External links

1982 births
Living people

People from Hershey, Pennsylvania
Tisch School of the Arts alumni
African-American women singers
Xavier University of Louisiana alumni
Actresses from Philadelphia

American television actresses
African-American actresses
American film actresses
American stage actresses
21st-century American actresses
21st-century American singers
21st-century American women singers